Daniel Wong Kwok-tung (born 28 July 1949) is a Hong Kong lawyer and politician. He is a current member of the Kowloon City District Council for Prince constituency. Prior to that, he had been elected member of the Yau Tsim District Board, Urban Council and Wong Tai Sin District Council. He is a current member of the Democratic Party, before that he was a member of the Hong Kong Association for Democracy and People's Livelihood (ADPL), The Frontier and the League of Social Democrats (LSD).

Biography
Wong was born in 1949 and was educated at the National Taiwan University in Taiwan. He first contested in the 1988 District Board election where he won a seat in the Yau Tsim District Board for Yau Ma Tei North. He went on and won a seat in Urban Council, representing Yau Tsim in the 1989 Urban Council election, where he served through the transfer of sovereignty of Hong Kong until the abolishment of the Provisional Urban Council in 1999. 

During the time, Wong joined the pro-democratic Hong Kong Association for Democracy and People's Livelihood (ADPL) and unsuccessfully challenged Frederick Fung's chairmanship in 1995, in which he and his supporters accused of Fung for taking the position of Hong Kong Affairs Advisers from the Beijing government. Wong also ran in the 1995 Legislative Council election but was defeated by James To of the Democratic Party.

Wong later quit the ADPL and joined the more radical The Frontier. He ran in the 2003 District Council election and was elected to the Wong Tai Sin District Council through Choi Wan East. He held onto the seat until he was defeated by Timothy Choy Tsz-kin of the Democratic Alliance for the Betterment and Progress of Hong Kong (DAB) in 2015. During that time, Wong became the founding member of the League of Social Democrats (LSD) but later switched to the Democratic Party.

In the 2019–20 Hong Kong protests, Wong volunteered for giving legal assistance to hundreds of arrested protesters. In the 2019 District Council election, Wong campaigned for District Councillor for the third time, running in Prince of the Kowloon City District Council. He defeated pro-Beijing incumbent Ting Kin-wa with a margin of 293 votes.

Notes

References 

1949 births
Living people
Solicitors of Hong Kong
Members of the Urban Council of Hong Kong
National Taiwan University alumni
District councillors of Yau Tsim District
District councillors of Wong Tai Sin District
District councillors of Kowloon City District
Democratic Party (Hong Kong) politicians
League of Social Democrats politicians
The Frontier (Hong Kong) politicians
Hong Kong Association for Democracy and People's Livelihood politicians
Members of the Election Committee of Hong Kong, 2017–2021